Haysville is a borough in Allegheny County, Pennsylvania, United States, along the Ohio River. The population was 81 according to the 2020 census, making it the least-populous municipality (out of 130) in Allegheny County.

Geography
Haysville is located at  (40.525534, -80.158945).

Surrounding and adjacent neighborhoods
Haysville has three land borders with Aleppo Township to the north, Glenfield to the east and Glen Osborne to the west.  Across the Ohio River to the south, Haysville runs adjacent with Coraopolis and Neville Township.

Education
Haysville is served by the Quaker Valley School District.

Government and politics

Demographics

As of the census of 2000, there were 78 people, 36 households, and 21 families residing in the borough. The population density was 389.0 people per square mile (150.6/km2). There were 38 housing units at an average density of 189.5 per square mile (73.4/km2). The racial makeup of the borough was 97.44% White, and 2.56% from two or more races.

There were 36 households, out of which 22.2% had children under the age of 18 living with them, 41.7% were married couples living together, 13.9% had a female householder with no husband present, and 38.9% were non-families. 27.8% of all households were made up of individuals, and 13.9% had someone living alone who was 65 years of age or older. The average household size was 2.17 and the average family size was 2.68.

In the borough the population was spread out, with 15.4% under the age of 18, 9.0% from 18 to 24, 30.8% from 25 to 44, 23.1% from 45 to 64, and 21.8% who were 65 years of age or older. The median age was 42 years. For every 100 females, there were 95.0 males. For every 100 females age 18 and over, there were 78.4 males.

The median income for a household in the borough was $33,750, and the median income for a family was $49,375. Males had a median income of $29,167 versus $21,250 for females. The per capita income for the borough was $53,151. There were 9.5% of families and 17.3% of the population living below the poverty line, including 23.1% of under eighteens and 12.5% of those over 64.

See also
List of cities and towns along the Ohio River

References

External links

Pennsylvania populated places on the Ohio River
Populated places established in 1902
Boroughs in Allegheny County, Pennsylvania